The girls' doubles draw for the 2008 Australian Open.

Ksenia Lykina and Anastasia Pavlyuchenkova won the title, defeating Elena Bogdan and Misaki Doi in the final, 6–0, 6–4

Seeds

Draw

Finals

Section 1

Section 2

Girls' Doubles
Australian Open, 2008 Girls' Doubles